Andrés Núñez Vargas (born July 27, 1976) is a Costa Rican football player who currently plays as a winger for Universidad.

Club career
Before being transferred to Saprissa in 2001, Núñez played for Santa Bárbara and Cartaginés.

With Saprissa he has already won two national championships, a UNCAF Cup and a CONCACAF Champions Cup title, and was part of the team that played the 2005 FIFA Club World Championship Toyota Cup, where Saprissa finished third behind São Paulo and Liverpool. He left them in summer 2010 and later played for Brujas and Herediano before joining Jacó Rays in Segunda División.

International career
Núñez made his debut for Costa Rica in a May 2001 UNCAF Nations Cup match against Guatemala and has earned a total of 10 caps, scoring 1 goal. He represented his country in 1 FIFA World Cup qualification match and played at the 2007 CONCACAF Gold Cup.

His final international was a June 2008 FIFA World Cup qualification match against Grenada.

International goals
Scores and results list Costa Rica's goal tally first.

References

External links
 
 

1976 births
Living people
Sportspeople from San José, Costa Rica
Association football defenders
Costa Rican footballers
Costa Rica international footballers
2001 UNCAF Nations Cup players
2007 CONCACAF Gold Cup players
C.S. Cartaginés players
Deportivo Saprissa players
Brujas FC players
C.S. Herediano footballers
C.F. Universidad de Costa Rica footballers
Municipal Grecia players